The Awadh Samman is an award constituted by the Government of  Uttar Pradesh, to honor exceptional and meritorious contribution in their chosen field/profession. Prominent recipients of award include Naushad, Lata Mangeshkar, Dilip Kumar, Dev Anand, Amitabh Bachchan, Ashok Kumar Udit Narayan and A R Rahman.

Zee News Awadh Samman Awardees for 2012

General Award

Lifetime Achievement Award

Literature

Zee News Awadh Samman Awardees for 2009
Awards were presented at the Taj Hotel in Lucknow.

General Award

Lifetime Achievement Award

Special Achievement Award

Awardees for 2008

Awardees for 2007

Sahara Awadh Samman Awardees for 2006
Award was presented to recipients in a ceremony held at the Laxman Mela ground in Lucknow. Award included a Rs 1 Lakh & atrophy.

General Award

Radico Awadh Samman Awardees for 2005
Award was presented to recipients in a ceremony in Lucknow.

General Award

Naaz-e-Awadh

Awardees for 2004

Sahara Awadh Samman Awardees for 2003
Award was presented to recipients in  a ceremony in Lucknow.,

General Award

IAAC Awadh Samman Awardees for 2002
Awards were by Governor Vishnu Kant Shastri presented in a ceremony held at the Laxman Mela ground in Lucknow.

General Award

Awadh Samman Awardees for 2001
Award was presented to recipients in a ceremony in Lucknow by Governor Vishnu Kant Shastri., The award included Rs. 1 lakh, a citation and a memento.

General Award

Awadh Samman Awardees for 1999
Award was presented to recipients in a ceremony in Lucknow.

General Award

Awadh Samman Awardees for 1980
Award was presented to recipients in a ceremony in Lucknow by Governor Vishnu Kant Shastri .

General Award

References

Civil awards and decorations of Uttar Pradesh
Awadh